Jug Stanojev (born 29 July 1999) is a Serbian footballer who plays as a winger for TSC.

Career statistics

Honours
Grafičar Beograd
 Serbian League Belgrade: 2018–19

References

External links
 
 
 

1999 births
Living people
Association football defenders
Serbian footballers
Serbian First League players
Serbian SuperLiga players
RFK Grafičar Beograd players
FK TSC Bačka Topola players